The Governor Nelson A. Rockefeller Empire State Plaza (known commonly as the Empire State Plaza, and also as the South Mall) is a complex of several state government buildings in downtown Albany, New York.

The complex was built between 1965 and 1976 at an estimated total cost of $2 billion. It houses several departments of the New York State administration and is integrated with the New York State Capitol, completed in 1899, which houses the state legislature. Among the offices at the plaza are the Department of Health and the Biggs Laboratory of the Wadsworth Center. The Empire State Art Collection, a major public collection of 1960s and 1970s monumental abstract artworks, is on permanent display throughout the site. The New York State Office of General Services maintains the plaza. The Nelson A. Rockefeller Empire State Plaza Performing Arts Center Corporation is a New York state public-benefit corporation that was created in 1979 to manage the performing arts facility in the plaza.

History 
The plaza was the idea of Governor Nelson Rockefeller, who was inspired to create the new government complex after Princess Juliana of the Netherlands visited Albany for a celebration of the area's Dutch history. Riding with the princess through a section of the city known colloquially as "the Gut", Rockefeller was embarrassed. He later said, "there's no question that the city did not look as I think the Princess thought it was going to".

Rockefeller conceived the basic design of the complex with architect Wallace Harrison in flight aboard the governor's private plane. Rockefeller doodled his ideas in pen on the back of a postcard, and Harrison revised them. They used the vast scope and style of Brasilia, Versailles and Chandigarh as models. The massive scale was designed to be appreciated from across the Hudson River, as the dominant feature of the Albany skyline.

Paying for the construction of the plaza was a major problem, since a bond issue for an Albany project would almost certainly have been disapproved by the statewide electorate. Despite the displacement of thousands of loyal political voters, Albany Mayor Erastus Corning worked with Rockefeller to engineer a funding scheme that used Albany County bonds instead of state bonds. During repayment, the state guaranteed the principal and interest payments in the form of rent for a plaza that was officially county property. Ownership was then to be transferred to the state in exchange for regular payments in lieu of taxes. Control of the bond issues gave Corning and party boss Daniel P. O'Connell influence when dealing with the Republican governor. The bonds were paid in 2001 and the state assumed ownership, though it required years to do the paperwork to change title.

The state obtained possession of the 98.5-acre site on March 27, 1962 through eminent domain. Demolition of the 1,200 structures began in the fall of 1962 and continued through the end of 1964. The official groundbreaking was on June 21, 1965, with an initial cost estimate of $250 million. The project was plagued by delays. Unrealistic schedules set by the state forced contractors for various parts to interfere with each other during work. The difficult working conditions caused some of the contractors to successfully sue the state later.

The first building to be completed was the Legislative Office Building in 1972, and the last was the Egg in 1978. Though the plaza was dedicated on November 21, 1973, it finally began full operation in 1976 at a total cost exceeding $1.7 billion.  , more than 11,000 state employees work at the complex.

Area before demolition 
When the State of New York seized the area in March 1962, it was home to about 7,000 residents according to the 1960 US Census. Like urban cores in most other American cities in the Northeast and Midwest, downtown Albany had seen sharp declines in white population, downtown retail activity, and hotel occupancy rates since World War II. At the same time, the African American population had doubled in the downtown census tracts between 1950 and 1960. At the time of the State's 1962 seizure, the largest ethnic group in the entire area was African American, at about 14% of the total population. First and second generation Italian Americans made up about 10% of the area's population.

The 98-acre area was made up of several distinct neighborhoods. To the south, clustered around Madison and Grand streets was the heart of Albany's Italian American community. Although only about half of Little Italy was seized by the State, the demolition and subsequent noise and dirt associated with the construction of the Empire State Plaza led many residents to move, even if their homes were not appropriated. To the north lay Albany's rooming house district, centered on Jay, Lancaster, and Hudson streets between Eagle and S. Swan. About 10% of the buildings torn down for the Empire State Plaza were rooming houses. In them lived over 1,000 single men, often elderly and poor. They made up about one third of all households and at least 15% of the take area's population. The eastern part of the take area, where the South Mall Arterial is now, was Albany's "Gut", an area of cheap hotels, flophouses, and dive bars. The take area also boasted elegant homes, particularly on State Street at the northern end and Elm Street below Madison.

The area in and around the seized area had long been home to immigrants and their churches. Five churches operated in the area in the years just before its seizure by the state. Holy Cross, a German national Catholic church founded in 1850, was at the corner of Hamilton and Philip streets. Due to declining numbers, it relocated in 1959 to Western and Brevator on the city's western fringe. Assumption of the Blessed Virgin Mary, a French national Catholic church, was at 109 Hamilton, between Grand and Fulton streets. Like Holy Cross, the church had seen a drop in parishioners to the point that in 1961 it celebrated only four baptisms and one marriage. Assumption relocated to the northern suburb of Loudonville. First Methodist Church, dating back to the 18th century, stood on the corner of Hudson and Philip streets.

After the State demolished the church, its congregants decided to merge with Trinity Methodist on Lark and Lancaster Streets, rather than try to start up again in a new location. St. Sophia Greek Orthodox Church at 8 Lancaster Street was the heart of the Greek-American community, and was in the midst of a major expansion campaign when the state seized the area. It relocated to Whitehall Road on Albany's fringe. A bit further west stood St. Paul's Episcopal Church at 78 Lancaster Street. Founded in 1827, it moved to the Lancaster Street location in 1862. The Lancaster church boasted several Tiffany stained glass windows, attesting to the former wealth of the area. It relocated to Hackett Blvd. in 1965.

Just outside the area seized by the State stood 3 churches. St. Anthony, on the corner of Madison and Grand (the building now houses  Grand Street Community Arts), was the largest and most vibrant of the three nearby Catholic national churches. Just a few blocks west, at the corner of Madison and Eagle stands the Catholic Cathedral of the Immaculate Conception. The predominantly black Wilborn Temple was growing along with the African American population of the area. In 1957 it relocated from 79 Hamilton Street, within the area seized by the State in 1962, to the former Beth Emeth synagogue on S. Swan between Lancaster and Jay.

2017 microgrid electric project 
In May 2017, New York Gov. Andrew Cuomo's administration announced the state would later in the year begin construction on a new microgrid that would provide power to the Empire State Plaza. The new microgrid project is expected to produce 90% of the complex's yearly electric energy needs. The Cuomo administration said the project should save the state $2.7 million in annual energy costs and cut down on greenhouse emissions. The project will use natural gas-fired turbine generators.

Architecture

The Empire State Plaza consists of various steel and reinforced concrete buildings, all clad in imported stone (except The Egg, which fully exposes its concrete structure).  The buildings are placed on a 6-story stone-clad Main Platform, supported by more than 25,000 steel pilings driven an average of  into soft glacial clay deposits underlying the site.

The placement of starkly abstract geometric building forms on a monolithic plaza is said to represent Rockefeller's concept of architecture as similar to sculpture. The exterior columns and narrow windows of the buildings resemble the style of the World Trade Center towers in New York City, which were completed around the same time.

Wallace Harrison served as supervising architect for the entire project, with other associated firms as listed below.  The buildings constituting the plaza include:

 the four Agency office buildings (numbered "Agency 1" through "Agency 4")
 the Mayor Erastus Corning 2nd Tower
 The Egg (a theater)
 the Cultural Education Center (State Museum, Library, and Archives)
 the Robert Abrams Building for Law and Justice (known previously as the Justice Building), by architects Sargent, Crenshaw, Webster, and Folley
 the Legislative Office Building (LOB), by architects James, Meadows, and Howard
 the Swan Street Building (sectioned into "Core 1" through "Core 4"), by architects Carson, Lundin, and Shaw

The scale of the buildings in the plaza is imposing, and the complex is the most easily recognizable aspect of the Albany skyline. The 44-story Corning Tower is the tallest building in New York State outside of New York City; the Swan Street Building is more than a quarter of a mile long (400 meters), and modeled partly on Pharaoh Hatshepsut's Temple at Deir el-Bahri, Egypt. The Main Platform of the plaza itself is one of the largest buildings in the world. A detailed walking tour guide can be downloaded, describing the many varieties of stone and concrete used in construction.

The observation deck on the 42nd floor of the Corning Tower is free and open to the public on weekdays.  However, it does not feature a 360-degree view because it has no windows on the west side. The tower is the tallest building in New York State outside of New York City.

At least 15 memorials are on the plaza, including the New York State Fallen Firefighters Memorial as well as memorials for World War II and the Vietnam War. The plaza has shade trees on the edges, and in the side gardens and memorials. Originally, hundreds of Norway maples were planted; today, they have been classified as invasive plant species by the State of New York.

The plaza also features an ice skating rink and decorative water fountain.

Layout 

The buildings are set around a row of three reflecting pools.  On the west side are the four 23-story,  Agency towers.  On the east side is the Egg (Meeting Center) and the 44-floor Erastus Corning Tower, which has an observation deck on the 42nd floor. On the south end is the Cultural Education Center, set on a higher platform; and on the north end is the New York State Capitol. While the Capitol predates the plaza, it is connected to the Concourse by an escalator which allows underground access to the rest of the plaza, most notably (to the New York State Legislature, at least), the Legislative Office Building.

The plaza is connected to the MVP Arena (a covered sports arena, known formerly as the Pepsi Arena, and originally named the Knickerbocker Arena) by a pedestrian bridge and to the New York State Capitol by a tunnel. Additionally a tunnel that runs under the West Capitol Park connects the Capitol building with the Alfred E. Smith Building at 80 South Swan Street.

The entire complex is wheelchair-accessible, except the State Street Capitol entrance and the Concourse tunnel to the Swan Street Building. An access map is available onsite or is downloadable.

Transportation 

Crossing under the plaza is the South Mall Arterial, a short highway artery connecting to the Dunn Memorial Bridge. Construction of this highway destroyed many buildings of Albany's downtown. In the initial proposal, the highway was to go from Interstate 90 in North Greenbush (current exit 8 to NY Route 43), through Rensselaer, under the plaza, and connecting to the also-cancelled Mid-Crosstown Arterial, which would have extended from I-90 Exit 6, through the city, traveling underneath Washington Park, meeting with the South Mall Expressway in the process, and continuing on to the New York State Thruway at Exit 23. The current South Mall Arterial ends abruptly in a loop at Swan Street, with both eastbound and westbound lanes using the two outer portals of the four-portal tunnel leading under the plaza. (The inner two were to be express lanes to the Mid-Crosstown Arterial/SME interchange underneath the park.) The only evidence of the original Mid-Crosstown Arterial is the four level stack interchange for I-90 at present day US 9.

Over 3,000 parking spaces take up much of the lower levels of the Main Platform.

There are several CDTA bus routes serving the plaza complex, including some with direct access to a bus station in the underground Concourse.

Concourse
The Concourse is Albany's "Underground City" with food courts, a McDonald's restaurant, banks, a post office, a CDTA bus station, a visitor's center, and several retailers. The Concourse connects all buildings of the state plaza, and many state workers spend their lunch hour there. The Concourse also features various works of art and sculptures, part of the State collection of modern abstract art.

Art collection 

The Governor Nelson A. Rockefeller Empire State Plaza Art Collection is located throughout the complex, within the underground Concourse, buildings, and outdoor areas. The Collection includes 92 large-scale paintings, sculptures, and tapestries at various locations. Glenn D. Lowry, director of the Museum of Modern Art in New York City, has termed the plaza's display of American art "the most important State collection of modern art in the country". The Collection has also been called "the greatest collection of modern American art in any single public site that is not a museum". The Collection represents a significant attempt to "integrate the fine arts into the lives of those who ordinarily might not be exposed to them".

The pieces in the Collection were selected by a commission appointed by Governor Nelson A. Rockefeller in 1965. The commission included Wallace K. Harrison; Robert M. Doty; René d'Harnoncourt; Seymour H. Knox, II; and (after 1968) Dorothy Miller. Governor Rockefeller reviewed and approved each artwork.

The Collection features modern artists who worked in New York State. In Rockefeller's words: "New York is the center of the contemporary movement in the (international) art world. ... [T]hese great artists should be represented in the state complex." Significantly, Rockefeller preferred modern art with no explicit social or political content: "I like strong, simple painting without a message".

There are 92 works created between 1952 and 1973 by 63 artists. Of these, 16 pieces are site-specific commissions. Artistic styles range from Abstract Expressionism to Minimalism, Pop Art, and Op Art. Thus, the Collection is "an encyclopedia of abstraction as practiced in the sixties".

Free guided tours for groups or individuals are available by appointment, and self-guided Acoustiguide tours are also available.

Artworks

Memorials
The Empire State Plaza has at least 15 memorials of various types, built by the New York State Office of General Services. State memorials to World War II, the Korean War, and the Vietnam War are here, as well as special memorials to women veterans, police, firefighters, crime victims, children, and missing persons. An illustrated and annotated self-guided tour brochure is available for download.

Controversy 
 
The complex was the subject of significant controversy around the time of its construction. About 7,000 people were evicted under eminent domain, mostly from working-class and poorer sections of older Albany. The construction of the plaza occurred during the decline of Albany's downtown shopping district, and the massive displacement of population allegedly hastened the process. Numerous restaurants, specialty shops, two major department stores, and downtown's last movie theater had shuttered by the end of construction. The majority of the displaced residents had not owned cars, and they had shopped locally. The construction of the elevated plaza separated the largely residential neighborhoods surrounding Washington Park and points west, from the largely commercial streets between the State Capitol and the Hudson River.

The plaza has also been criticized for the cost of its lavish architecture (marble and other imported stone are used throughout), its sheer size, and its period architecture.  In a sharply critical 1976 The New York Times article, architectural reviewer Paul Goldberger described the complex as "a compendium of clichés of modern architecture".  He further commented that "Ultimately, of course, one realizes that the entire mall complex is not so much a vision of the future as of the past. The ideas here were dead before they left the drawing board, and every design decision, from the space allocations to the overall concept, emerges from an outdated notion of what modern architecture, not to mention modern government, should stand for." In his 1980 book, The Shock of the New, Robert Hughes refers to the buildings as being in "The International Power Style of the Fifties", comparing the buildings to those built by Fascist governments (Fascist architecture). Architecture critic Martin Filler, quoted in The Making Of Empire State Plaza, says "There is no relationship at all between buildings and site, neither at grade nor atop the podium, since all vestiges of the existing site have been so totally obliterated. Thus, as one stands on the Plaza itself, there is an eerie feeling of detachment. The Mall buildings loom menacingly, like aliens from another galaxy set down on this marble landing strip."

Gallery

See also

 Albany Convention Center
 Downtown Albany Historic District, adjacent area
 Hudson River–Black River Regulating District
 Port of Albany-Rensselaer
 Public art
 Underground city
 Urban renewal

References

Further reading

External links 

98 Acres in Albany: Documenting the Area Demolished to Build the Empire State Plaza
The Empire State Plaza at Emporis Buildings
Images of the Empire State Plaza
The Making of the Empire State Plaza
Empire State Plaza at Everything2
Empire State Plaza Art Collection online annotated catalog, including photos
"Albany's Empire State Plaza delivers art and history" - Poughkeepsie Journal
Endless Empire (Jimmy Vielkind, Politico New York)
Web page criticizing the Empire State Plaza
the Nelson A. Rockefeller Empire State Plaza Performing Arts Center Operating Corporation website

 
Government buildings completed in 1976
1970s architecture in the United States
Modernist architecture in New York (state)
Skyscraper office buildings in New York (state)
Skyscrapers in Albany, New York
Brutalist architecture in New York (state)